Joshua Beltz (born 24 April 1995) is an Australian field hockey player who plays as a defender for the Australia national team and the Tassie Tigers.

Personal life
Beltz grew up in Hobart, Tasmania.

Joshua Beltz also has a younger brother, Hayden, who represents Australia's Under 21 side, the 'Burras'.

Career

Junior National Team
Beltz was first named in the 'Burras' squad in 2016. That year he played in the 2016 Junior Oceania Cup, a qualifier for the Junior World Cup.

After gaining qualification for the Junior World Cup, Beltz was also an inclusion in that team, where Australia lost 3–0 to Germany in the Bronze Medal Match to finish fourth overall.

Senior National Team
Beltz made his international debut for the Kookaburras in 2015, in a test match against India.

Since his debut, Beltz has been a regular inclusion in the Kookaburras squad, most notably winning a gold medal at the 2016 Champions Trophy.

In November 2018, Beltz was named in the Kookaburras squad for the 2019 calendar year.

Beltz was selected in the Kookaburras Olympics squad for the Tokyo 2020 Olympics. The team reached the final for the first time since 2004 but couldn't achieve gold, beaten by Belgium in a shootout.

References

External links
 
 
 

1995 births
Living people
Australian male field hockey players
Sportsmen from Tasmania
Male field hockey defenders
Field hockey players at the 2020 Summer Olympics
Olympic field hockey players of Australia
Olympic silver medalists for Australia
Medalists at the 2020 Summer Olympics
Field hockey players at the 2022 Commonwealth Games
Commonwealth Games gold medallists for Australia
Commonwealth Games medallists in field hockey
Olympic medalists in field hockey
20th-century Australian people
21st-century Australian people
Sportspeople from Hobart
2023 Men's FIH Hockey World Cup players
Medallists at the 2022 Commonwealth Games